The Lake Placid Ice Dance International is an annual ice dance competition held in Lake Placid, New York. It was first held in 1932. In 2015 and 2016, the senior international event was included in the International Skating Union's calendar. The event takes place early in the season, usually in late July. Medals are awarded on the senior and junior levels.

The 2021 edition of the event was held in Norwood, Massachusetts due to construction at its traditional Lake Placid site.

Medalists

Senior

Junior

References

External links 
 

International figure skating competitions hosted by the United States